Darpa hanria is a species of skipper butterfly found in Nepal, northern parts of Laos and Thailand and in the Indian states of Sikkim and Assam. It was first described by Frederic Moore in 1866.

References

Tagiadini
Butterflies of Indochina